Steamtrain Maldegem-Eeklo (SME), is a heritage railway located at Maldegem in northern Belgium. It is located at the former NMBS station. Standard gauge trains run on the line to Eeklo, where the SCM has its own station. A  narrow gauge line runs to Donk on the former line to Bruges; this was supplemented by the standard gauge line in 1989.

Stock List

Steam locomotives

Operational
Standard Gauge
Avonside No. 1908 of 1925. Named "Fred".
La Meuse  of 1926. Named "Bébert".
St. Léonard n°947 of 1893. Build in Liège. 
Hunslet, No. 3796 of 1953, WD196, "Errol Lonsdale". Previously based on the South Devon Railway in England.
 Hanomag 0-4-0WT of 1906.

Non Operational
Narrow Gauge
TKh No. 5387, named "General Maczik". Moved to SME from the Northampton & Lamport Railway in England in 2006.
Haine St. Pierre n°416 of 1891. Awaiting restoration
Orenstein & Koppel 0-4-0WT of 1911 (works number 4854). Named "Marie", Static. (First Locomotive of SME)
 "Adolphe" Tubize 4-6-2 (miniature) 1935. Built for Brussels World Fair railway. Awaiting restoration.
Standard Gauge
Haine Saint-Pierre n°1405 of 1923. Stored awaiting restoration.
 41.195 (Ex-SNCB) Macintosh superheated 0-6-0. Awaiting restoration.             
 AD08 "La Meuse" (ex-CFV3V) awaiting restoration.

Diesel locomotives
Operational
Standard Gauge
SNCB Class 74 7408. Operational.
SNCB Class 80 8040. Operational.
SNCB Class 91 9151. Operational.
Narrow Gauge
Moës 4wDM.
Moës 4wDM, named "NELE".
Diema DS30-1 
Non Operational
Standard Gauge
Moës shunter named "Karien"
Narrow Gauge
Moës 4wDM, to be named "Dolly", under repair.
Simplex 4wDM, Under restoration off site.

Diesel multiple units

Operational
Standard Gauge
SNCB Class 44 single car unit 4403 Operational.
SNCB Class 46 single car unit 4620 Operational.
SNCB Class 49 single car unit 4903 Operational.
SNCB Inspection unit ES202.
Non Operational
Standard Gauge
SNCB Class 44 single car unit 4405 Will be scrapped

References

External links
 Official Website

600 mm gauge railways in Belgium
Heritage railways in Belgium
Tourist attractions in East Flanders
Maldegem